After the 2019 Maharashtra Legislative Assembly elections, post-poll alliance was formed in between Shiv Sena, Nationalist Congress Party and Indian National Congress to form Maha Vikas Aghadi (MVA). Uddhav Thackeray, the president of Shiv Sena was sworn in as the 19th Chief Minister of Maharashtra on 28 November 2019. Following is the list of ministers from the cabinet of Uddhav Thackeray starting from November 2019.

Government formation
The Thackeray ministry proved its majority in the Legislative Assembly on November 30, 2019.

Council Ministers

Cabinet Ministers

Ministers of State

By Departments
An alphabetical list of all the departments of Maharashtra Government with terms :
Cabinet Ministers

District Wise break up

Guardian Ministers

Ministers by Party

Former members

Economy

References

Cabinets established in 2019
2019 establishments in Maharashtra
2019 in Indian politics
Thackeray
Nationalist Congress Party
Shiv Sena
Indian National Congress
Cabinets disestablished in 2022
2022 disestablishments in India